Google I/O (or simply I/O) is an annual developer conference held by Google in Mountain View, California. "I/O" stands for Input/Output, as well as the slogan "Innovation in the Open". The format of the event is similar to Google Developer Day.

History

Google I/O 2020 was cancelled due to the COVID-19 pandemic, but Google I/O 2021 took place online. Google I/O returned to its in-person format in 2022; the most recent event, Google I/O 2022, took place as an in-person conference for the first time since the one held in 2019.

Evolution

2008 

Major topics included:

 Android
 App Engine
 Bionic
 Maps API
 OpenSocial
 Web Toolkit

Speakers included Marissa Mayer, David Glazer, Steve Horowitz, Alex Martelli, Steve Souders, Dion Almaer, Mark Lucovsky, Guido van Rossum, Jeff Dean, Chris DiBona, Josh Bloch, Raffaello D'Andrea, Geoff Stearns.

2009 
Major topics included:

 AJAX APIs
 Android
 App Engine
 Chrome
 OpenSocial
 Wave
 Web Toolkit

Speakers included Aaron Boodman, Adam Feldman, Adam Schuck, Alex Moffat, Alon Levi, Andrew Bowers, Andrew Hatton, Anil Sabharwal, Arne Roomann-Kurrik, Ben Collins-Sussman, Jacob Lee, Jeff Fisher, Jeff Ragusa, Jeff Sharkey, Jeffrey Sambells, Jerome Mouton and Jesse Kocher.

Attendees were given a HTC Magic.

2010 
Major topics included:

 APIs
 Android
 App Engine
 Chrome
 Enterprise
 Geo
 OpenSocial
 Social Web
 TV
 Wave

Speakers included Aaron Koblin, Adam Graff, Adam Nash, Adam Powell, Adam Schuck, Alan Green, Albert Cheng, Albert Wenger, Alex Russell, Alfred Fuller, Amit Agarwal, Amit Kulkarni, Amit Manjhi, Amit Weinstein, Andres Sandholm, Angus Logan, Arne Roomann-Kurrik, Bart Locanthi, Ben Appleton, Ben Chang, Ben Collins-Sussman.

Attendees were given a HTC Evo 4G at the event. Prior to the event US attendees received a Motorola Droid while non-US attendees received a Nexus One.

2011 

Major topics included:

 Android
Google Play Music
Google Play Movies
Honeycomb 
Ice Cream Sandwich
 Chrome and ChromeOS
Chromebooks from Acer and Samsung
Angry Birds for Chrome
 In-app purchases for Chrome Web Store

Attendees were given a Samsung Galaxy Tab 10.1, Series 5 Chromebook and Verizon MiFi.

The after party was hosted by Jane's Addiction.

2012 

The I/O conference was extended from the usual two-day schedule to three days. There was no keynote on the final day. Attendees were given a Galaxy Nexus, Nexus 7, Nexus Q and Chromebox. The after party was hosted by Paul Oakenfold and Train.

Major topics included:

 Android
3D imagery for Earth
 400 million users announcement
Analytics
Google Now
Jelly Bean
 In-app purchases for Wallet
 Project Butter
 Chrome
 310 million users announcement
 Chrome for Android is stable
iOS app
 Compute Engine
 Docs
 Offline editing
 Drive
 App for iOS
 SDK (v.2)
 Glass
 Gmail
 425 million users announcement
 Google+
Hangouts app and metrics
 Platform for Mobile with SDKs and APIs
 Maps
 Offline for Android
 Enhanced maps in API
 Transit data in API
 Nexus
7
Q
 YouTube
 Updated 720p HD API
 Heat maps and symbols in API
 Updated Android app

2013 
Google I/O 2013 was held at the Moscone Center, San Francisco. The amount of time for all the $900 (or $300 for school students and faculty) tickets to sell out was 49 minutes, even when registrants had both Google+ and Wallet accounts by requirement. A fleet of remote-controlled blimps streamed a bird's-eye view of the event. Attendees were given a Chromebook Pixel. The after party was hosted by Billy Idol and Steve Aoki
.

Major topics included:

 Android
 900 million users announcement
 Updated Search
Studio
 App Engine
PHP support
 Google+
 Redesign with photo and sharing emphasis
 Hangouts
 Updated IM platform
 Maps
 Redesign on web and Android
 Play
Games
Music All Access
 Play for Education
Samsung Galaxy S4 to be sold
 Updated Google Play Services
 TV
 Update to Jelly Bean

2014 
Major topics included:

 Android
Auto
Lollipop
Material Design
One
Slides
TV
Wear
 Chromebook
 Improvements
 Google Fit
 Gmail
 API

Attendees were given a LG G Watch or Samsung Gear Live, Google Cardboard, and a Moto 360 was shipped to attendees after the event.

2015 
Major topics included:

 Android Marshmallow
 App permission controls
 Native fingerprint recognition
 "Deep sleep", a mode which puts the device to sleep for power saving
USB-C support
 Deep-linking app support, which leads verified app URLs to the app in the Play store.
Android Pay
 Android Wear
 "Always on" extension to apps
 Wrist gestures
 Chrome
Custom tabs Gmail
 Inbox availability for everyone
Maps
 Offline mode
 Nanodegree, an Android course on Udacity
Now
 Reduction in voice error
 Context improvements
Photos
Play
 "About" tabs for developer pages
 A/B listings
 Store listing experiments
 "Family Star" badge
Project Brillo, a new operating system for the Android-based Internet of things.
Project Weave, a common language for IoT devices to communicate.

Attendees were given an Nexus 9 tablet and an improved version of Google Cardboard

2016 
Sundar Pichai moved Google I/O to Shoreline Amphitheatre in Mountain View, CA for the first time. Attendees were given sunglasses and sunscreen due to the amphitheater's outside conditions, however many attendees were sunburned so the talks were relatively short. There was no hardware giveaway.

Major topics included:

 Allo
 Android
Daydream, Android support for VR was shown with Daydream.
 Instant Apps, a code path that downloads a part of an app instead of accessing a web app, which allows links to load apps on-demand without installation. This was shown with the B&H app.
 Nougat
 Wear 2.0
The inaugural Google Play Awards were presented to the year's best apps and games in ten categories.
Assistant
Duo
Firebase, a mobile application platform, now adds storage, reporting and analytics.
Home
Play integration with ChromeOS

2017 
 Major topics included:

 Android Oreo
Project Treble, an Android Oreo feature that modularizes the OS so carriers can update their smartphones easier.
 Flutter, a cross-platform mobile development framework that enables fast development of apps across iOS and Android.
 Google.ai
Google Lens
Google Assistant became available on iOS devices.
A new standalone (in-built) virtual reality system to be made by the HTC Vive team and Lenovo.

Attendees were given a Google Home and $700 in Google Cloud Platform Credits. The afterparty was hosted by LCD Soundsystem.

2018 
Major topics included:

Android Pie
 Digital Wellbeing initiatives 
 Material Design 2.0
 Changes in Gmail
 Android Wear 3.0
 An Impressive Google Assistant
 AR/VR efforts
 Updated Google Home

Attendees were given an Android Things kit and a Google Home Mini. The after party was hosted by Justice with Phantogram opening.

2019 
Major topics included:

 Android Q Beta 3
 Pixel 3a and 3a XL
 Flutter on web
Google Lens
 Firebase
 AR walking directions in Google Maps
 Offline, streamlined Google Assistant
 Assistant driving mode
 Kotlin-First Development
 Rebranding of Google Home devices to Google Nest
 Live Caption
 Project Mainline (streamlined OS update process on Android Q)
 Google Duplex web API

The after party was hosted by The Flaming Lips. There was no hardware giveaway.

2020 
The 2020 event was originally scheduled for May 12–14. Due to the coronavirus pandemic, the event was considered for alternative formats and eventually canceled.

2021
Major topics included:

Smart Canvas on Google Docs
Google Meet
LaMDA
TPU v4
Multitask Unified Model (MUM)
AR objects in Google Search
Google Maps
Indoor Live View
Detailed street maps
Tailored maps
Area busyness
Google Shopping
Little Patterns and Cinematic Moments on Google Photos
Android
Material You
Android 12 Beta 1
Integration with ChromeOS and Google TV
Expansion of Android Auto
Wear OS
Merging with Samsung Tizen
UI redesign
Integration with Fitbit
Google Health
Project Starline

A "pre-show" was held before the keynote, featuring a performance from Tune-Yards and Google Arts & Culture's "Blob Opera" experiment.

2022 
Major topics included:
 Android 13
 Immersive View
 Search With Scene Exploration
 Privacy Control For Ads
 Matter
 Google Wallet
 Pixel 6a
 Pixel Buds Pro
 Pixel 7 and Pixel 7 Pro (preview)
 Pixel Watch (preview)
 Pixel Tablet (preview)

References

External links
 
 Official app
 Google I/O 2008 Session Videos and Slides
 Google I/O 2009 Session Videos and Slides
 Google I/O 2010 Session Videos and Slides
 Google I/O 2011 Session Videos and Slides
 Google I/O 2012 Session Videos and Slides
 Google I/O 2013 Session Videos and Slides
 Google I/O 2014 Session Videos and Slides
 Google I/O 2015 Session Videos
 Google I/O 2016 Session Videos
 Google I/O 2017 Session Videos
 Google I/O 2018 Session Videos
 Google I/O 2019 Session Videos
 Google I/O 2021 Session Videos
 Google I/O 2022 Session Videos
 Google Developers at I/O on Twitter

I O
Software engineering conferences
 
Web-related conferences
Recurring events established in 2008